Abdullah Abu Sayeed (born 25 July 1939) is a Bangladeshi educator, writer, television presenter, and activist. He is the founder and chairman of Bishwa Sahitya Kendra, a non-profit organization that promotes the study of literature, reading habits and progressive ideas.

Early life
Sayeed was born on 25 July 1939, to a Bengali Muslim family in Park Circus, Calcutta. His father was Azimuddin Ahmed, a teacher of English and Bengali literature, and a playwright. Their ancestral home was in Kamargati, Bagerhat District. Sayeed passed the Secondary School Certificate (SSC) exam from RM Academy, Pabna in 1955 and the Higher Secondary Certificate (HSC) exam from Prafulla Chandra College in Bagerhat in 1957. He later earned BA and MA degrees in Bengali from the University of Dhaka in 1960 and 1961 respectively.

Career
Sayeed started his career as a guest teacher at Government Haraganga College, Munshiganj. Then he taught at Sylhet Women college for some time. In 1962 he joined Rajshahi College as a full-time teacher. After 5 months he joined Government Science College, Dhaka. He was also an acting principal for 2 years when he was only 23 years old. He also taught bangla as a part-time lecturer at BUET

Sayeed gave an interview for the post of assistant professor.  Being impressed by Sayeed's brilliance and personality  Dhaka College's renowned principal Jalaluddin Ahmed invited Sayeed to Dhaka College.  
Sayeed later became the dept head of the Bengali language at Dhaka College. He was very popular among his students. It is said that even students from other colleges came to attend his classes. He wrote a book on his teaching career named Nishfola Mather Krishok (Farmer of an infertile land)   He edited the literary magazine Kanthashar (The Voice) in the 1960s which promoted a new trend in Bangladeshi literature.

In the mid-1970s, he started presenting Shaptabarna (Seven Colors), a TV show on Bangladesh Television. In the 1970s and 1980s, he also presented TV show Eid Anadamela. He received the National Television Award in 1977.

In 1978, he founded the Bishwa Sahitya Kendra.

Works
Sayeed has written and edited more than 50 books.
 Bidaye, Obonti (2005)
 Bohe Joloboti Dhara (2006)
 Bhalobashar Shampan (2007)
 Bishwo Shahitto Kendro O Ami (2007) 
 Bisrosto Journal (2007)
 Amar Uposthapok Jibon (2008)
 Amar Ashabad (2009)
 Amar Boka Shoishob (2010)

Awards
 Ramon Magsaysay Award (2004) in journalism, literature, and creative communication arts for "cultivating in the youth of Bangladesh a love for books and their humanizing values through exposure to the great works of Bengal and the world".
 National Television Award (1977)
 Mahbub Ullah Trust Award (1998)
 Ekushey Padak (2005)
 Bangla Academy Literary Award (2011) for his essays
 Khan Muhammad Farabi Memorial Award (2012)
 Star Lifetime Award on Education (2016)

References

1939 births
Living people
Bangladeshi male writers
University of Dhaka alumni
Academic staff of Dhaka College
Ramon Magsaysay Award winners
Recipients of Bangla Academy Award
Recipients of the Ekushey Padak
People from Bagerhat District